bluebird bio, Inc., based in Somerville, Massachusetts, is a biotechnology company that develops gene therapies for severe genetic disorders.

The company's only - in the European Union (EU) - approved drug is betibeglogene autotemcel (Zynteglo), which treats transfusion-dependent beta thalassemia (TDT), a rare genetic blood disorder, and has been approved for use by the European Medicines Agency. The company has been criticized for the $1.8 million cost of the drug, which is the second most expensive drug in the world.

The company is developing LentiGlobin gene therapy for the treatment of sickle cell disease and cerebral adrenoleukodystrophy. It is also developing T cell product candidates to treat acute myeloid leukemia, Merkel-cell carcinoma, diffuse large B-cell lymphoma, and MAGEA4 solid tumors.

History
The company was founded as Genetix Pharmaceuticals in April 1992 by MIT faculty members Philippe Leboulch and Irving London.

In 2001, Walter Ogier was appointed chief executive officer of Genetix Pharmaceuticals, and the company was focused on the development of LentiglobinTM for the treatment of sickle cell disease and thalassemia major (beta-thalassemia), the two most globally prevalent severe human genetic diseases.

In September 2010, preliminary results of clinical trials of LentiglobinTM at Hospital Necker in Paris, France, were published in the journal Nature by Drs. Marina Cavazzana-Calvo and Philippe Leboulch, scientific founder of Genetix Pharmaceuticals / bluebird bio.  Stable (21 months) transfusion independence had been successfully achieved by a patient with severe beta-thalassemia who had been treated with Lentiglobin 2 years earlier.  This represented the first-ever long term correction of a major human genetic disease by gene therapy.  Nature 467, 318–322 (2010)

Also in September 2010, the company was renamed bluebird bio and Nick Leschly was named chief executive officer.

In June 2013, the company became a public company via an initial public offering, raising $116 million.

In June 2014, the company acquired Precision Genome Engineering Inc. for up to $156 million.

In November 2017, Celgene, now Bristol-Myers Squibb (BMS), announced a collaboration with bluebird bio regarding bb2121 Anti-BCMA CAR-T Cell Therapy. In May 2020, the Food and Drug Administration (FDA) issued a refusal to file letter to BMS and bluebird bio's marketing application seeking approval of idecabtagene vicleucel (ide-cel) for patients with heavily pre-treated relapsed and refractory multiple myeloma. In September 2020, the FDA accepted bluebird's marketing application for ide-cel in and established a PDUFA goal date of March 27, 2021. US approval of ide-cel by March 31, 2021, is one of the required remaining milestones of the contingent value rights (CVR) issued upon the close of Bristol Myers Squibb's purchase of Celgene in 2019. Ide-cel is a BCMA-directed genetically modified autologous CAR-T-cell immunotherapy.

In August 2018, the company announced a collaboration with Regeneron Pharmaceuticals to discover, develop and commercialize new cell therapies for cancer.

On October 8, 2021, bluebird bio, Inc. announced the impending spinoff of a new public company 2seventy bio focused on oncology. The spin-off is expected to be completed by early November 2021. bluebird bio's corporate filing announced they have appointed Najoh Tita-Reid and Sarah Glickman to the bluebird bio board of directors. Ms. Glickman will be a member of the board of directors of 2seventy bio and will step down from the bluebird bio board of directors when the new arrangement goes into effect.

Products

 Zynteglo: In June 2019, the company received approval from the European Commission to market in the EU betibeglogene autotemcel (Zynteglo), a medication for the treatment of the beta thalassemia group of inherited blood disorders. Bluebird received the FDA's approval for the treatment in August 2022. The FDA granted Zynteglo orphan drug and breakthrough therapy designations for the treatment of TDT.
Skysona: In July 2021 the company received approval from the European Commission to market elivaldogene autotemcel (Skysona) for the treatment of adrenoleukodystrophy.

References

External links
 
 

1992 establishments in Massachusetts
2013 initial public offerings
Biotechnology companies of the United States
Companies based in Cambridge, Massachusetts
Companies listed on the Nasdaq
Pharmaceutical companies established in 1992
American companies established in 1992